Hygropoda is a genus of nursery web spiders that was first described by Tamerlan Thorell in 1894.

Species
 it contains twenty-six species and one subspecies, found only in Asia, Africa, and Australia:
Hygropoda africana Simon, 1898 – Gabon, Sierra Leone
Hygropoda albolimbata (Thorell, 1878) – Indonesia (Ambon)
Hygropoda argentata Zhang, Zhu & Song, 2004 – China, Thailand
Hygropoda balingkinitanus (Barrion & Litsinger, 1995) – Philippines
Hygropoda borbonica (Vinson, 1863) – Réunion
Hygropoda bottrelli (Barrion & Litsinger, 1995) – Philippines
Hygropoda campanulata Zhang, Zhu & Song, 2004 – China, Thailand
Hygropoda celebesiana (Strand, 1913) – Indonesia (Sulawesi)
Hygropoda chandrakantii (Reddy & Patel, 1993) – India
Hygropoda dolomedes (Doleschall, 1859) – Indonesia (Ambon)
Hygropoda gracilis (Thorell, 1891) – India (Nicobar Is.)
Hygropoda higenaga (Kishida, 1936) – China, Taiwan, Japan
Hygropoda linearis (Simon, 1903) – Madagascar
Hygropoda lineata (Thorell, 1881) – Indonesia to Australia
Hygropoda longimana (Stoliczka, 1869) – Bangladesh, Malaysia
Hygropoda longitarsis (Thorell, 1877) – Vietnam, Indonesia (Sulawesi)
Hygropoda l. fasciata (Thorell, 1877) – Indonesia (Sulawesi)
Hygropoda macropus Pocock, 1897 – Indonesia (Moluccas)
Hygropoda madagascarica Strand, 1907 – Madagascar
Hygropoda menglun Zhang, Zhu & Song, 2004 – China
Hygropoda procera Thorell, 1895 – Myanmar
Hygropoda prognatha Thorell, 1894 (type) – Singapore
Hygropoda sikkimus (Tikader, 1970) – India (mainland, Andaman Is.)
Hygropoda subannulipes Strand, 1911 – Indonesia (Aru Is.)
Hygropoda taeniata Wang, 1993 – China
Hygropoda tangana (Roewer, 1955) – Tanzania, Kenya, South Africa, Madagascar
Hygropoda yunnan Zhang, Zhu & Song, 2004 – China, Thailand, Laos

See also
 List of Pisauridae species

References

Araneomorphae genera
Pisauridae
Spiders of Africa
Spiders of Asia
Spiders of Australia
Taxa named by Tamerlan Thorell